Senator Mahoney may refer to:

Francis J. Mahoney (1897–1956), New York State Senate
John Mahoney (Ohio politician) (1949–2011), Ohio State Senate
Walter J. Mahoney (1908–1982), New York State Senate

See also
William Mahone (1826–1895), U.S. Senator from  Virginia from 1881 to 1887
Joseph C. O'Mahoney (1884–1962), U.S. Senator from Wyoming from 1934 to 1953 and from 1954 to 1961